Olongapo, officially the City of Olongapo, is a 1st class highly urbanized city in the Central Luzon region of the Philippines. Located in the province of Zambales but governed independently from the province, it has a population of 260,317 people according to the 2020 census.

Along with the municipality of Subic, it comprises Metro Olongapo, one of the twelve metropolitan areas in the Philippines.

History

British period
Britain ruled the Philippines for a short time, from 1762 to 1764. The British invasion of the Philippines was the first challenge to Spain's control of the archipelago after 191 years of rule. The Royal Navy and British Army joined with the East India Company in Madras to capture Spain's Asian colony.

In conjunction with the attack against Spain's key possession in the Americas, Havana, both settlements were successfully seized. However, in the Philippines, whilst the expedition was launched as part of a plan to harass the Spaniards in their possessions, as well as for commercial gain and new territories, the military campaign led by General William Draper and Admiral Samuel Cornish, may have been launched under the guise of an invasion in order to gain prize money.

The publication When Britain Ruled the Philippines 1762–1764 describes the events as they unfolded at the Admiralty in London and at the East India Company in Madras, leading to the invasion and occupation of the capital city of Manila and the port city of Cavite. The capital was looted, a galleon was seized, and the British commanders imposed a ransom of four million dollars upon the Spaniards. The enormous sums in prize money and valuables seized mainly benefited the commanders.

Spanish period

In 1868, a Spanish military expedition was dispatched to study the possibility of relocating the Cavite Naval Station in Subic Bay due to its unhealthy condition.

Spanish King Alfonso XII through a Royal Decree made Subic Bay (then called Subig) as Spain's stronghold in the Far East in 1884. Vice Admiral Juan Bautista de Antiquiera made Olongapo a settlement for the Spanish Navy.

On March 8, 1885, the Spanish Naval commission authorized construction of the Arsenal in Olongapo. The Spanish planned to make their naval station, and the village of Olongapo an island, protected against attack by rebels. The Spanish Navy Yard occupied the entire area east of the Spanish Gate. Employing Filipino labor, they did extensive dredging of the harbor and the inner basin and built a drainage canal.  The canal served both to drain the swampy area around the yard and also to form a line of defense.

Within ten years, the Spaniards had erected walls and markers to fence off the arsenal. They had shops and buildings erected. The Spanish government spent almost fifteen years developing the naval station. From higher naval commands, the order was sent to fortify Grande Island at the mouth of Subic Bay with mines and cannons. But this project was hardly begun before it was overtaken by the rout of the Spanish Navy in Manila Bay by US Admiral George Dewey.

American period

On May 1, 1898, the construction of the Spanish Administration Building was nearly complete when Admiral Dewey's flagship, led the Asiatic Fleet into Manila Bay. A detachment of Admiral Dewey's fleet bombarded the navy yard. Eventually, after the surrender, Spain relinquished all her rights in the Philippines to the United States. This marked the end of more than three hundred years of Spanish rule over the islands.

Realizing the tremendous importance of Olongapo as a naval facility, the U.S. Navy decided to keep the base in functioning order; the President of the United States, then Theodore Roosevelt, on November 9, 1901, by executive order, reserved the waters of Subic and some of the adjacent lands for naval purposes.

The naval station was widened and with the establishment of the American rule in the Philippines. American defenses in the islands were facilities left by the Spanish Navy which were taken over by the United States.

Olongapo grew in direct proportion to the growth of the naval station.  More people came to live in Olongapo since the Navy offered employment.  To most Filipinos during that time, it was a welcome change.  The promise of a different kind of experience as shop workers and office help induced many young men to leave their farms and fishing boats to work in the Navy Yard.  Others finding the lure of the sea irresistible joined the U.S. Navy.

Olongapo impressed its visitors as being one of the finest communities in the country. People passing through the town never failed to comment on its cleanliness and orderliness.

World War II

When the war broke out in 1941, the old town was obliterated.  Olongapo had to suffer the brunt of destruction twice.

On December 14, 1941, Japanese bombers attacked the Olongapo/Subic Bay area. Ten days later, the order was given to burn Subic Bay Naval Station and withdraw.  Olongapo was set aflame by the local Filipinos in anticipation of Japanese troop arrival.  The USS New York was scuttled in Subic Bay. When the American forces made a last-ditch stand on the Bataan peninsula, the Naval Station was abandoned and most of its facilities were burned before the Japanese came.

In 1945, Olongapo was again bombed, shelled and burned. Joint American and Philippine Commonwealth ground troops aided the recognized guerrilla fighters in liberating Olongapo from the Japanese forces. With the exceptions of the Station Chapel (it was the Olongapo Parish Church before the war) and the Spanish Gate, none of its former landmarks withstood the sweep of the war's fury. The general headquarters between the United States Army, Philippine Commonwealth Army & Philippine Constabulary were located in Olongapo during and after World War II, and were active until 1946 after operating against the Japanese for the liberation of Central Luzon.

Reconstruction and rehabilitation 

Shortly after the war was over, the Philippines was granted independence. Olongapo was one of the principal naval bases retained by the United States. The Navy started to rebuild the town after the hostilities ceased. Olongapo was built on a new undeveloped site a couple of miles north of its former location. The prewar town site became part of the base.

The first few years after the war were difficult for the new town, as everything in the new Olongapo was damaged. There were no electric power and no drainage system. The water supply and sanitation facilities were inadequate, and streets were unpaved. Gradually, Olongapo evolved into a new community: new businesses were established, housing projects were planned and civic facilities were restored.

During the Korean War, the United States spent over US$170 million to convert the base into the homeport of the Navy's Seventh Fleet, developing the Cubi Naval Air Station as the largest United States installation of its kind in Asia. Naval authorities relocated the residence from the area of the former Public Works Center area to the intersection of what is now known as Rizal Avenue and Ramon Magsaysay Drive, and in the Barangays New Asinan and New Kalalake areas. Zoning of Olongapo was patterned after American practice where streets are constructed along straight lines. The magnitude of facilities construction in the Olongapo and Subic Bay area brought growth and prosperity to Olongapo. By 1956, migrants from nearby towns and provinces had swelled the population to 39,180.

Cityhood

Unlike the rest of the Philippines which gained independence from the United States after World War II in 1946, Olongapo was governed as a part of the United States naval reservation. The Subic Bay Naval Base commanding officer was chairman of the Olongapo town council, school board, and hospital board. Olongapo's 60,000 Filipino residents paid taxes to the United States Navy and those accused of crimes involving American servicemen were tried in US Navy courts. In July 1955, Manila mayor Arsenio Lacson announced that United States service personnel accused of crimes in Manila would be tried in Philippine courts because of United States Navy abuses of Filipinos in Olongapo.

On October 23, 1959, Olongapo was placed under martial law when Robert Grant, the American owner of an Olongapo auto parts store was killed and the US Navy declined to identify or try the Naval Supply Depot sentry who shot him.

Olongapo was the last piece of Philippine territory surrendered by the United States to the country in the 1950s. On December 7, 1959, 56,000 acres of land with electrical, telephone and water utilities was relinquished to Philippine Secretary of Foreign Affairs Felixberto Serrano. The first mayor appointed was civic leader Ruben Geronimo. He was later succeeded by business entrepreneur Ildefonso Arriola.

Six years later, through the efforts of Representative Ramon Magsaysay Jr. in Congress and Senator Genaro Magsaysay in the Senate, President Ferdinand Marcos signed R.A. 4645. Olongapo was reconverted to a chartered city on June 1, 1966. The adjacent U.S. Naval Base Subic Bay headed by Manuel Ardonia was the largest United States Navy installation in the Pacific at the time, and employed 15,000 Filipino civilians. The base was visited by 215 ships per month as Vietnam War activity peaked in 1967. The nightclubs along Ramon Magsaysay Drive between the naval base main gate and Rizal Avenue were notoriously popular among the 4,225,000 servicemen visiting the base that year.
Talented Filipino musicians and singers, inexpensive San Miguel beer, attractive teenage prostitutes, erotic floor shows, Jeepney rides back to the naval base and children diving for coins tossed from the bridge over the estuarine drainage channel in front of the naval base main gate were popular amenities among the sailors. Olongapo was then upgraded as a highly urbanized city on December 7, 1983.

Mount Pinatubo eruption 

On June 15, 1991, Mount Pinatubo,  from the city, violently erupted with a force eight times greater than the May 1980 eruption of Mount St. Helens. Volcanic clouds blocked out the sun. Volcanic earthquakes and heavy muddy rain, as well as thunderstorms from a typhoon passing over Central Luzon, darkened the area for 36 hours in what would become known as "Black Saturday".
This caused widespread damage to the United States facility and Olongapo City.

On September 16, 1991, the Senate leaders of the Philippines did not grant an extension of the existing RP-US Military Bases Agreement between the Republic of the Philippines and the United States, thus terminating the stay of the United States military in the Philippines.

Present-day Olongapo

Olongapo surged to national prominence during the incumbency of Mayor Richard Gordon, who, like his father before him, was against the departure of US military forces, yet lobbied for the turnover of the facility and its conversion into a freeport in 1992. Gordon spearheaded a volunteerism strategy to return an ailing economy to prosperity after Mount Pinatubo's eruption and the withdrawal of US forces. The strategy worked across all demographics and involved a strong corps of 8,000 volunteers who protected and preserved the abandoned base facilities from poachers. Gordon complemented this with an aggressive advocacy campaign to convert the area into a protected area and industrial zone. Later, he launched an aggressive international investment promotion which resulted in the accelerating the development of a prime industrial and tourism zone in the country, the Subic Bay Freeport Zone (SBFZ).

As the first chartered city and highly urbanized city in its province, Olongapo's reputation among Filipinos rose from being a "sin city" in the 1960s and 1970s into a "model city" in the 1980s, 1990s and 2000s.

Geography 

Because of this peculiar geographic location, development of city land is limited. Also, the territorial borders from nearby towns are not properly marked.

Climate 

Olongapo has a tropical monsoon climate (Köppen climate classification: Am). Temperatures are relatively cooler during the months of December, January and February, and increase slightly from March to May, which are the warmest months of the year in this part of the Philippines.

The months of December to April are extremely dry but the wet season persists for the remaining period in a year. In August, the monthly rainfall total even reaches .

The city receives an average of  rainfall every year.

Barangays 

The city is politically subdivided into 17 barangays.

{| border="0" class="wikitable sortable" style="width:600px"
|-
! Barangay !! Population (2010)
!Population (2015)!! Captain
|- style="text-align:center;"
! scope="row" | New 
Asinan
| 3,341
|3,445
| 
|- style="text-align:center;"
! scope="row" | New Banicain
| 6,588
|6,851
|Ivan P. Tanega
|- style="text-align:center;"
! scope="row" | Barretto
| 18,840
|19,340
| Angelito "Gie" Baloy
|- style="text-align:center;"
! scope="row" | East Bajac-bajac
| 17,334
|17,165
| Gilbert G. Pinero
|- style="text-align:center;"
! scope="row" | East Tapinac
| 9,373
|9,253
| Dante Hondo
|- style="text-align:center;"
! scope="row" | Gordon Heights
| 26,086
|27,874
| Priscilla B. Ponge
|- style="text-align:center;"
! scope="row" | Kalaklan
| 12,934
|13,137
| Sunday P. Mostacho
|- style="text-align:center;"
! scope="row" | Mabayuan
| 10,323
|10,622
|   Edwin Esposo
|- style="text-align:center;"
! scope="row" | New Cabalan
| 25,428
|27,714
| Delbert Muega
|- style="text-align:center;"
! scope="row" | New Ilalim
| 1,423
|1,518
|Gilbert P. Durago
|- style="text-align:center;"
! scope="row" | New Kababae
| 2,261
|2,404
| Ferdinand Quinto
|- style="text-align:center;"
! scope="row" | New Kalalake
| 9,219
|9,808
| Randy C. Sionzon
|- style="text-align:center;"
! scope="row" | Old Cabalan
|  18,259
|19,274
| Lester Nadong
|- style="text-align:center;"
! scope="row" | Pag-asa
| 5,672
|6,070
| Rodolfo Catalogan
|- style="text-align:center;"
! scope="row" | Santa Rita
| 39,793
|43,632
| Ermelando Anonat
|- style="text-align:center;"
! scope="row" | West Bajac-bajac
| 7,548
|8,007
| Anthony C. Deldio
|- style="text-align:center;"
! scope="row" | West Tapinac
| 6,756
|6,926
| Donald Elad Aquino
|}

Demographics

Language 
The city's population speaks a wide array of the nation's main languages, specifically: Tagalog, Sambal, Kapampangan, Pangasinan and Ilocano. The phenomenon of mixing native languages with English (e.g. Taglish, a mixture of Tagalog and English) is also common, especially amongst the youth. Many more languages are also spoken from other denominations of people.

Religion 

Majority of the people of Olongapo are Roman Catholics, followed by members of the Iglesia ni Cristo. Protestants, Evangelicals, Born Again, Jehovah's Witnesses, Mormons, Members Church of God International, Nichiren Buddhism (Sokka Gakkai International), United Methodist Church, and Islam are also present.

Vicariate
The ten Roman Catholic Parishes of Olongapo City is grouped as the Vicariate of San Jose and is under the Roman Catholic Diocese of Iba. The Parishes are namely: 
St. Joseph Parish (1920) in Barangay East Bajac-Bajac 
St. Columban Parish (1963) in Barangay New Asinan 
Santa Rita Parish (1967) in Barangay Santa Rita 
Holy Trinity Parish (1975) in Barangay New Cabalan 
St. Anne Parish (1985) in Brgy Gordon Heights 
Immaculate Conception Parish (1986) in Barangay Barretto 
San Lorenzo Ruiz Parish (1991) in Barangay New Kalalake 
Holy Family Parish (1992) in Barangay Kalaklan 
St. Vincent de Paul Quasi-Parish in Barangay Old Cabalan 
San Roque Quasi-Parish in the Subic Bay Freeport Zone.

Government

Olongapo, belonging to the 1st District of Zambales, is governed by a City Mayor designated as its Local Chief Executive and by a City Council as its Legislative body in accordance with the Local Government Code. Both the Mayor and the ten City Councilors are elected directly by the people through an election which is being held every three years.

As an Independent City from the province of Zambales, only the city government officials are voted by the residents of the city. The provincial government has no political jurisdiction over local transactions of the city government.

Mayors 
The following is the list of all Mayors that ruled Olongapo after World War II:

{| class="wikitable sortable plainrowheaders" style="width:42.5rem"
|-
! scope="col" | Name
! scope="col" | Term
! scope="col" | Position
|-
! scope="row" | Ruben Geronimo
| data-sort-value="1959-11" | November 1959 – 1962
| Municipal Mayor
|-
! scope="row" | Ildefonso Arriola
| data-sort-value="1962" | 1962 – 1964
| Municipal Mayor
|-
! scope="row" | James Gordon
| data-sort-value="1964-01" | January 1, 1964 – June 1, 1966
| Municipal Mayor
|-
! scope="row" | James Gordon
| data-sort-value="1966-06" | June 1, 1966 – February 20, 1967
| City Mayor
|-
! scope="row" | Jaime Guevarra
| data-sort-value="1967-02" | February 20, 1967 – 1968
| City Mayor
|-
! scope="row" | Amelia (née Juico) Gordon
| data-sort-value="1968-01" | January 1, 1968 – June 30, 1972
| City Mayor
|-
! scope="row" | Geronimo Lipumano
| data-sort-value="1972-07" | July 1972 – May 1980
| City Mayor
|-
! scope="row" | Richard Gordon
| data-sort-value="1980-06" | June 30, 1980 – April 23, 1986
| City Mayor (1st term)
|-
! scope="row" | Teodoro Macapagal
| data-sort-value="1986-03" | March 1986 – November 1987
| OIC Mayor
|-
! scope="row" | Teodoro Macapagal
| data-sort-value="1987-11" | November 1987 – January 1988
| OIC Mayor
|-
! scope="row" | Richard Gordon
| data-sort-value="1988-02" | February 2, 1988 – March 13, 1992
| City Mayor (2nd term)
|-
! scope="row" | Cynthia Cajudo
| data-sort-value="1992-03" | March 13, 1992 – March 21, 1995
| City Mayor 
|-
! scope="row" | Rexy Gregorio Cruz
| data-sort-value="1995-03" | March 22, 1995 – June 30, 1995
| City Mayor (Acting)
|-
! scope="row" | Katherine Gordon
| data-sort-value="1995-06" | June 30, 1995 – June 30, 2004
| City Mayor
|-
! scope="row" | James Gordon, Jr.
| data-sort-value="2004-06" | June 30, 2004 – June 30, 2013
| City Mayor
|-
! scope="row" | Rolen Calixto Paulino Sr.
| data-sort-value="2013-06" | June 30, 2013 – September 3, 2018
| City Mayor
|-
! scope="row" | Lugie Lipumano-Garcia
| data-sort-value="2018-09" | September 3, 2018 – March 3, 2019
| OIC Mayor
|-
! scope="row" | Rolen Calixto Paulino Sr.
| data-sort-value="2019-03" | March 4, 2019 – June 30, 2019
| City Mayor 
|-
! scope="row" | Rolen Co Paulino Jr.
| data-sort-value="2019-05" | July 1, 2019 – present
| City Mayor 
|}

Public Safety

Fire & Rescue Service 

The City Disaster Risk Reduction and Management Office (known as Olongapo City DRRMO are government agency which umbrella to the city government and the national government such as National Disaster Risk Reduction and Management Council (NDRRMC), Department of National Defense (DND) and Department of the Interior and Local Government (DILG). This Agency have its well trained Rescue Service, have its own Fire and Rescue equipment and Emergency Response Service for any kind of disasters. it has a capability that they adopt from the American servicemen from the Former US Naval Base. the DRRMO are separated from Olongapo City Fire Station (OCFS) under the Bureau of Fire Protection (DILG-BFP) with its same capability usual to other Fire Services.

The city have its own Barangay Fire Services use as first responder in their respective communities. another Fire and Rescue Service was from the nearest Subic Bay Freeport Zone under its own Fire Department controlled by Subic Bay Metropolitan Authority with finest trained personnel and Rescue Equipment abandoned by the Americans similar to DRRMO. The Philippines Oldest Fire Truck made by Americans respond to the major notable disaster such as 1991 eruption of Mount Pinatubo, Fukushima disaster cleanup in 2011 and Typhoon Haiyan Search and Rescue operations in 2013.

Crime & Law Enforcement 

The city has six different police stations under control by Olongapo City Police Office (OCPO) and was umbrella to Philippine National Police (PNP). The city police main garrison was on Camp Cabal (also known in locals as "164") at Barangay Barretto. Additional policy implementation agency is controlled by the Subic Bay Metropolitan Authority - Law Enforcement Department (SBMA-LED) which securing the coastal waters of Subic Bay and its nearby Freeport Zone under Republic Act 7227 (it is known as "SBMA Police").

Contrary to traffic enforcement, the city has separate law enforcement which is the Office of the Traffic Management and Public Safety (OTMPS). The office focuses on implementation of color coded transport scheme, security of government-owned establishment, organizing public market, and providing traffic enforcement safety which was mandated parallel and coordinated to Land Transportation Office.

Infrastructure

Transportation

Airport 
There are no airports in Olongapo itself although Subic Bay International Airport in the adjacent town of Morong, Bataan serves the general area of Olongapo. The airport is within the Subic Bay Freeport Zone and was formerly known as Naval Air Station Cubi Point, when it was still an airbase of the United States.

Sea Port 

Olongapo is served by the Port of Subic Bay, operated and managed by the Subic Bay Metropolitan Authority. Some facilities of the seaport are located on the Olongapo portion of the Subic Freeport Zone namely the Alava, Bravo, and Rivera Wharves.

Roads 

The city has an organized road network, featuring a series of rectangular street grids. The primary road that connects Olongapo to the rest of the other is the Jose Abad Santos Avenue. In the city's main district, the names of those streets running from North to South follow the English alphabet's order. While streets running East to West are numbered from 1st to 27th, starting from the South parallel and up. Even streets are on the East side of the city while the odd streets are on the West. Most of the roads in Olongapo are made of concrete and asphalt.

Public transportation 

The city boasts its color-coded public transportation system which it has pioneered in the country. All public utility jeepneys and tricycles have its own color code depending on the district, zone or route that it is serving. Taxi services are also operated in the city but are limited.

Bus Terminals 
Victory Liner and Saulog Transit are the leading bus operators having their own terminals in the city which transports people in and out of the city. Local bus terminals are also present and are primarily used for transportation in neighboring towns and inside the Subic Bay Freeport Zone.

Road infrastructure
Olongapo is accessible through the National Highway (via Zigzag Road) from Hermosa and Dinalupihan, Bataan. The National Highway cuts through the city center and goes through north up to Barangay Barreto and then on to the neighboring town of Subic, and the rest of the towns in Zambales up to Pangasinan province. Another access to the city is via SCTEX and Subic Freeport Expressway exiting to the gates of Subic Bay Freeport Zone and also, from the south, Morong, Bataan (via Balanga, Bataan) through the Morong gate of Subic Bay Freeport Zone.

Public Utilities

Electricity 
Electricity services were formerly provided by the government-run Public Utilities Department (PUD) since the city was founded. However, in the late 2000s, the city faced debt in its electricity distribution costs amounting to P5 billion to power suppliers and threatened to cut the city from the Luzon power grid. Then Mayor James Gordon Jr. also attributed the crisis to low collection rate due to nonpayment or debts incurred by consumers, widespread energy theft and corruption in the PUD. The situation worsened because of interests imposed by Private Sector Assets and Liabilities Management Corp. (PSALM), the refusal of the Energy Regulatory Commission (ERC) to grant an increase in power rates, and the years of delay in the PUD's privatization.

In 2013, through Republic Act No. 10373, the PUD was sold for Php 610 million to Olongapo Electricity Distribution Company (OEDC), an affiliate of Cagayan Electric Power and Light Company (CEPALCO), which was given a 25-year franchise to take over the city's power distributor. The company has since upgraded the city's obsolete and dilapidated distribution network and has made significant improvements to the city's electricity services.

Water 
Water services are provided by Subic Water and Sewerage Company (also known as Subic Water. Not to be confused with Subic Water District (SWD), which is a different water distribution company serving the neighboring towns of Subic, Zambales.). In 2013, the city's shares in Subic Water has been sold to Maynilad Water Services Inc. (Maynilad) to continue modernizing the city's water utilities services. In March 2016, this was reversed and the city has bought back its shares because the city wanted to have a representation in Subic Water because the city's constituents accounted for the majority of Subic Water's customers.

Notable personalities

Richard J. Gordon (b. 1945), politician and chairman of Philippine Red Cross
Angelee delos Reyes (b. 1987), Miss Philippines Earth 2013
Angelu de Leon (b. 1979), actress of GMA Network
Arnel Pineda (b. 1967), singer/lead vocalist of Journey
Blakdyak (Joseph Amoto-Formaran) (1969–2016), singer, comedian and actor
Mike Corgan (1918–1989), American football player
Eric Cray (b. 1988), track and field athlete, an Olympian at the 2016 Summer Olympics
Freddie Aguilar (b. 1953), noted musician, singer-songwriter
Jake Vargas (b. 1992), model and actor of GMA Network
Liezel Lopez (b. 1997), actress, model and StarStruck contestant
K Brosas (b. 1975), comedian, singer and host of ABS-CBN
Kristofer Martin (b. 1994), actor of GMA Network
Lauren Young (b. 1993), actress of GMA Network
Megan Young (b. 1990), actress and host of GMA Network, Miss World Philippines 2013 and Miss World 2013
Melissa Ricks (b. 1990), actress and host of ABS-CBN
Moira Dela Torre (b. 1993), singer-songwriter of ABS-CBN
Raikko Mateo (b. 2008) child actor of ABS-CBN, who took the titular role in Honesto
Samuel Morrison (b. 1991), athletic taekwondo, he won the gold medalist on seagames 2019
Rico Barrera (b. 1981), model and actor of ABS-CBN, Pinoy Big Brother season 1 housemate 
Simon Ibarra (b. 1960), actor, and model
Tom Rodriguez (b. 1987) actor of GMA Network
Willie Miller (b. 1977), basketball player
Wowie de Guzman (b. 1976), actor of ABS-CBN
Topex Robinson (b. 1974), former head coach of Phoenix Fuel Super LPG Masters
Darryl Yap (b. 1987), film director and screenwriter

Sister cities 
Olongapo has the following sister cities:
 Cabanatuan, Philippines
  Bremerton, Washington, United States
  National City, California,  United States
  Virginia Beach, Virginia, United States

References

External links

 [ Philippine Standard Geographic Code]
Olongapo City City Council 
Olongapo City Officials and Government Offices Telephone Directory

 
Cities in Central Luzon
Populated places in Zambales
Port cities and towns in the Philippines
Highly urbanized cities in the Philippines
Populated places established in 1750
1750 establishments in the Philippines